Muhammad Afzal (7 April 1939 – 21 April 2020) was a Pakistani wrestler. He competed in the 1964 Summer Olympics. 

Afzal died from the effects of COVID-19 during the COVID-19 pandemic in New York City.

References

External links
 

1939 births
2020 deaths
Wrestlers at the 1964 Summer Olympics
Pakistani male sport wrestlers
Olympic wrestlers of Pakistan
Deaths from the COVID-19 pandemic in New York (state)